Jennifer Rose Buczkowski (born April 4, 1985) is an American former soccer midfielder. She played for FC Kansas City in the NWSL. She previously played for the Philadelphia Independence and New Jersey Sky Blue of Women's Professional Soccer.

Early life
Buczkowski was born in Elk Grove Village, Illinois. She played three seasons at Elk Grove High School and was named by Gatorade as the 2003 Illinois Player of the Year.

University of Notre Dame
Buczkowski attended the University of Notre Dame from 2003–2007 and set the Notre Dame record for 103 career games played.  During her career at Notre Dame, she scored 77 points (22nd in Notre Dame history), 20 goals, 37 assists and 97 starts. Buczkowski was a three-time NSCAA All-American. She was among the final 15 candidates for the MAC Hermann Award in 2005 and 2006.

Club career

Sky Blue FC (WPS)
Buczkowski was a sixth-round selection (39th overall) in the 2009 WPS College Draft for the New Jersey Sky Blue. The team went on to win the national championship.

Philadelphia Independence (WPS)
The following season, Buczkowski was selected in the first round of the expansion draft by the Philadelphia Independence. During the 2011 season, Jen won the "Iron Women Award" for playing every minute of the season.

From 2009–2010, Buczkowski started in 38 of 41 games played in the WPS.

Chicago Red Stars (WPSL Elite)
After the folding of the WPS in early 2012, Buczkowski joined the Chicago Red Stars, in the semi-professional WPSL Elite. The team would go on to come in second to the Western New York Flash after penalty kicks during the WPSL final.

FC Kansas City (NWSL), 2013–2016
In 2013, she signed with FC Kansas City for the inaugural season of the NWSL. She started all 66 regular-season matches in the first three seasons of the NWSL for FCKC, the only player in the whole league to do so. Buczkowski won the NWSL Championship in 2014 & 2015 with FCKC.

She retired after FCKC's match on May 13, 2016, as she had enrolled in the DPT Program at the University of Kansas and her school schedule prevented her from playing soccer.

International career
Buczkowski was a member of several youth national teams.  She was a member of the U-19 World Cup team in 2003 and played every minute of the U-21 Nordic Cup tournament in 2005, in which the team won the championship.

Honors and awards

Team
with FC Kansas City:
 NWSL championship: 2014, 2015

Coaching career
Buczkowski joined the University of Notre Dame as Assistant Coach in 2007. In 2011, she joined the Lyons Township Soccer Club coaching staff.

References

External links
 
 Notre Dame player profile
 FC Kansas City player profile
 Jen Buczkowski on Twitter

1985 births
Living people
Notre Dame Fighting Irish women's soccer players
NJ/NY Gotham FC players
Philadelphia Independence players
American women's soccer players
National Women's Soccer League players
FC Kansas City players
Women's Professional Soccer players
Sportspeople from Park Ridge, Illinois
People from Elk Grove Village, Illinois
Soccer players from Illinois
Sportspeople from DuPage County, Illinois
Women's association football midfielders
Chicago Cobras players
USL W-League (1995–2015) players
Women's Premier Soccer League Elite players